Investigator Shoal, also known as ; Pawikan Shoal; ; Mandarin , is located in the SW of Dangerous Ground in the Spratly Islands of the South China Sea.

It is an atoll above water at low tide; some large rocks at the western end might be visible at high water. The lagoon is up to 45 meters deep.

It is one of the areas in the Spratly Islands occupied by Malaysia. The Royal Malaysian Navy has maintained an "offshore naval station" there called "Station Papa" since 1999.

References

External links
 Asia Maritime Transparency Initiative Island Tracker

Shoals of the Spratly Islands